George Cooper Healey (December 12, 1892 – December 9, 1943) was an American actor of the silent film era. Cooper appeared on stage first, then in 210 films between 1911 and 1940. His son George Cooper Jr. (1920–2015) was also an actor who appeared in films from 1947 until 1954.

Selected filmography

 The Cross-Roads (1912, Short) as Kirke Dundee
 Bianca (1913, Short) as Beppo aka Tony
 The Night Riders of Petersham (1914) as Coke
 The Tragedy of Whispering Creek (1914, Short) as The Kid
 The Unlawful Trade (1914, Short) as Young Tate
 The Hopes of Blind Alley (1914, Short) as The Little Janitor
 Mother's Roses (1915) as Paul Hutchinson
 The Wheels of Justice (1915) as 'Red' Hall, the Burglar
 The Battle of Frenchman's Run (1915, Short) as John
 Thou Art the Man (1916) as John MacDowell
 A Night Out (1916) as Waldo Deacon
 The Hunted Woman (1916) as Mortimer Fitzhugh
 The Vital Question (1916) as Richard King
 The Suspect (1916) as Valdor
 Her Secret (1917) as Charley
 The Auction Block (1917) as Jimmy Knight
 Fields of Honor (1918) as Paul
 The Struggle Everlasting (1918) as Slimy Thing
 Her Man (1918) as Jeb Havey
 The Dark Star (1919) as Mr. Brandes
 The Birth of a Soul (1920) as Joe Barlow
 The Very Idea (1920) as Fisherman
 Chains of Evidence (1920) as George Brownlow
 The Veiled Mystery (1920)
 For Those We Love (1921) as Bert
 I Am Guilty (1921) as Dillon
 The Fox (1921) as K.C. Kid
 Turn to the Right (1922) as Mugsy
 Bow Wow (1922) as The Country Girl's Sweetheart
 The Glorious Fool (1922) as Al
 The Love Letter (1923) as Red Mike
 Suzanna (1923) as Miguel
 Quicksands (1923) as Matt Patterson
 The Shriek of Araby (1923) as Presto the Magician
 The Nth Commandment (1923) as Max Plute
 Little Church Around the Corner (1923) as Jude Burrows
 The Eternal Three (1923) as Bob Gray
 The Ghost Patrol (1923)
 Her Temporary Husband (1923) as Conrad Jasper
 Through the Dark (1924) as Travel
 No More Women (1924) as Tex
 Torment (1924) as Chick Fogarty
 Riders Up (1924) as Henry, the Rat
 Behind the Curtain (1924) as Slug Gorman
 Unmarried Wives (1924)) as Joe Dugan
 Never Say Die (1924) as Gaston Gibbs
 Smouldering Fires (1925) as Mugsy
 The Devil's Cargo (1925) as Jerry Dugan
 The Great Divide (1925) as Shorty
 Just a Woman (1925) as Oscar Dunn
 The Lawful Cheater (1925) as Johnny Burns
 The Goose Woman (1925) as Reporter
 The New Commandment (1925) as Red
 Shadow of the Law (1926) as Chauffeur
 Red Dice (1926) as Squint Scoggins
 The Barrier (1926) as Sgt. Murphy
 The Wise Guy (1926) as The Bozo
 The Unknown Soldier (1926) as Cpl. Fogarty
 Pals First (1926) as The Squirrel
 Tin Hats (1926) as 'Lefty' Mooney
 Women Love Diamonds (1927) as Snub Flaherty
 The Lovelorn (1927) as Joe Sprotte
 Rose-Marie (1928) as Fuzzy
 The Trail of '98 (1928) as Samuel Foote as The Worm
 Lilac Time (1928) as Sergeant Hawkins
 The Barker (1928) as Hap Spissel
 The Devil's Apple Tree (1929) as Cooper
 The Unholy Night (1929) as Frey as Lord Montague's Orderly
 Sailor's Holiday (1929) as Shorty
 Under a Texas Moon (1930) as Philipe
 Numbered Men (1930) as 27635
 Shooting Straight (1930) as Chick
 The Girl of the Golden West (1930) as Trinidad Joe
 Renegades (1930) as Harry A. Biloxi
 Paid (1930) as Red
 Gentleman's Fate (1931) as Mike
 Laughing Sinners (1931) as Joe
 Emma (1932) as Airfield Mechanic (uncredited)
 Sky Devils (1932) as Mitchell
 Night Court (1932) as Safecracking Thug (uncredited)
 Flames (1932) as Fishey
 Blondie of the Follies (1932) as O'Brien as Stage Manager (uncredited)
 I Am a Fugitive from a Chain Gang (1932) as Vaudevillian (uncredited)
 Forbidden Trail (1932) as Happy as Tom's Sidekick
 Uptown New York (1932) as Al
 Grand Slam (1933) as Josh (uncredited)
 Soldiers of the Storm (1933) as Red Gurney
 Mary Stevens, M.D. (1933) as Pete
 Lady for a Day (1933) as Cheesecake (uncredited)
 Wild Boys of the Road (1933) as Vagrant Near Columbus (uncredited)
 Day of Reckoning (1933) as Hospital Patient in Traction (uncredited)
 Ever in My Heart (1933) as Lefty, a Soldier (uncredited)
 Havana Widows (1933) as Paymaster Mullins
 Before Midnight (1933) as Stubby
 The Big Shakedown (1934) as Shorty
 The Personality Kid (1934) as Tiny
 Return of the Terror (1934) as Cotton
 Broadway Bill (1934) as Joe
 Murder in the Clouds (1934) as Wings Mahoney
 West of the Pecos (1934) as Wes
 Doubting Thomas (1935) as Stagehand
 Anything Goes (1936) as Steward (uncredited)
 Mr. Deeds Goes to Town (1936) as Bob (uncredited)
 Federal Agent (1936) as Agent Wilson
 The Phantom Rider (1936, Serial) as Spooky
 Missing Girls (1936) as Zig
 Sitting on the Moon (1936) as Taxi Driver
 Ride 'Em Cowboy (1936) as Chuck Morse
 Adventure in Manhattan (1936) as Duncan
 Flying Hostess (1936) as Flight Attendant (uncredited)
 We're on the Jury (1937) as Oglesby as Taxi Driver (uncredited)
 When You're in Love (1937) as Assistant Immigration Officer (uncredited)
 Step Lively, Jeeves! (1937) as Slug
 The Man Who Found Himself (1937) as Hobo (uncredited)
 That I May Live (1937) as Mack
 Riders of the Dawn (1937) as Grizzly Ike
 Think Fast, Mr. Moto (1937) as Muggs Blake
 Portia on Trial (1937) as Efe
 The Duke Comes Back (1937) as Janitor
 West of Rainbow's End (1938) as Happy
 Having Wonderful Time (1938) as Camp Maintenance Man (uncredited)
 The Chaser (1938) as Man at Calhoun's Auto (uncredited)
 The Missing Guest (1938) as 'Jake'
 Boys Town (1938) as Tramp (uncredited)
 The Mexicali Kid (1938) as Blacksmith (uncredited)
 Say It in French (1938) as Taxi Driver (uncredited)
 Sweethearts (1938) as Electrician (uncredited)
 Stand Up and Fight (1939) as (scenes deleted)
 Lucky Night (1939) as $50 Passerby (uncredited)
 They All Come Out (1939) as Prisoner (uncredited)
 Blackmail (1939) as Hawley as Released Prisoner (uncredited)
 Mr. Smith Goes to Washington (1939) as Waiter (uncredited)
 I Take This Woman (1940) as Tommy (scenes deleted)

References

External links

1892 births
1943 deaths
20th-century American male actors
American male film actors
American male silent film actors
Male actors from Newark, New Jersey
Male actors from New Jersey